Helene Gotthold (31 December 1896 – 8 December 1944) was a Jehovah's Witness who was guillotined by Nazi Germany at Plötzensee Prison. She was charged with giving asylum to men who refused to fight for the Nazis and for holding illegal meetings for her faith.

References

Further reading

External links
Holocaust Encyclopedia: Helene Gotthold, United States Holocaust Memorial Museum
"Museums—Why Are They Worth a Visit?" database w/images (https://wol.jw.org/ : accessed 27 Aug 2019) Watchtower Online Library "Awake" 8 Mar 2005 pages 14-19
Blades, Dr.Larry professor at Highline Community College. Education Advisory Committee, Washington State Holocaust Education Resource Center "STUDYING THE HOLOCAUST: RESISTANCE, RESCUE AND SURVIVAL" 3 May 2005 (http://www.holocaustcenterseattle.org/ : accessed 27 Aug 2019) Holocaust Center for Humanity

German Jehovah's Witnesses
Persecution of Jehovah's Witnesses
German people executed by Nazi Germany
People executed by guillotine at Plötzensee Prison
Executed German women
1896 births
1944 deaths
Protestants in the German Resistance